The 2007 Next Generation Adelaide International was a professional men's tennis event on the 2007 ATP Tour in Adelaide, Australia, held from 1 January to 7 January 2007. Novak Djokovic won the title, an ATP International Series level tournament.

This was the first tournament of the season (alongside Viña del Mar, Delray Beach, Buenos Aires and Las Vegas) that implemented a 24-player round robin tournament for the singles competition, as part of the round-robin trials proposed during this season.

Singles main-draw entrants

Seeds 

 Rankings are as of 25 December 2006.

Other entrants 
The following players received wildcards into the main draw:
  Chris Guccione
  Alun Jones
  Peter Luczak

The following players received entry from the qualifying draw:
  Paul Baccanello
  Nathan Healey
  Wesley Moodie
  Go Soeda

The following player received entry as a lucky loser:
  Martín Vassallo Argüello

Withdrawals
During the tournament
  Janko Tipsarević → replaced by Martín Vassallo Argüello

Retirements
  Florent Serra (illness)
  Janko Tipsarević (adductor injury)

Doubles main-draw entrants

Seeds 

1 Rankings are as of 25 December 2006.

Other entrants 
The following pairs received wildcards into the main draw:
  Wayne Arthurs /  Chris Guccione
  Nathan Healey /  Robert Smeets

Retirements 
  Jan Hájek (dizziness)

Finals

Singles

 Novak Djokovic defeated  Chris Guccione, 6–3, 6–7(6–8), 6–4
 It was Djokovic's 1st title of the year and the 3rd of his career.

Doubles

 Wesley Moodie /  Todd Perry defeated  Novak Djokovic /  Radek Štěpánek, 6–4, 3–6, [15–13]
 It was 1st title of the year and the 2nd of his career for Moodie; 1st title of the year and the 5th of his career for Perry.
 Both players have won their 1st of a total of 2 titles as a team, with the other one being Valencia at the same year.

References

 
2007 ATP Tour
2000s in Adelaide
January 2007 sports events in Australia